The Caproni Ca.602 was a two-seat training aircraft built in Italy by Caproni in the 1930s at the Aeronautica Predappio factory. A single-seat aerobatic trainer was also built, as the Caproni Ca.603, featured reduced wing area, strengthened structure and inter-connected ailerons on upper and lower mainplanes.

Variants
Ca.602two-seat trainer
Ca.603single-seat aerobatic version of the Ca.602

Specifications (Ca.602)

References

Ca.602
Sport aircraft
Single-engined tractor aircraft
Biplanes